Acleris capizziana is a species of moth of the family Tortricidae. It is found in North America, where it has been recorded from Oregon.

The length of the forewings is about 10 mm. The forewings are grey with pinkish-brown markings. The hindwings are smoky white. Adults have been recorded on wing in September.

The larvae have been reared from strawberry.

References

Moths described in 1963
capizziana
Moths of North America